Oyster Creek Nuclear Power Station was a single unit 636 MWe boiling water reactor power plant in the United States. The plant is located on an  site adjacent to Oyster Creek in the Forked River section of Lacey Township in Ocean County, New Jersey. At the time of its closure, the facility was owned by Exelon Corporation and, along with unit 1 at Nine Mile Point Nuclear Generating Station, was the oldest operating commercial nuclear power plant in the United States. The plant first started commercial operation on December 23, 1969, and is licensed to operate until April 9, 2029, but Oyster Creek was permanently shut down in September 2018. The plant got its cooling water from Barnegat Bay, a brackish estuary that empties into the Atlantic Ocean through the Barnegat Inlet.

At the time of shutdown, Oyster Creek was one of four licensed nuclear power reactors in New Jersey. The others are the two units at the Salem Nuclear Power Plant, and the one unit at Hope Creek Nuclear Generating Station. As of January 1, 2005, New Jersey ranked 9th among the 31 states with nuclear capacity for total MWe generated. In 2003, nuclear power generated over one half of the electricity in the state.

In 1999, GPU agreed to sell the Oyster Creek Nuclear Plant to AmerGen Energy for $10 million. AmerGen was later purchased by Exelon in 2003. Exelon fully integrated AmerGen's former assets, including Oyster Creek, in early 2009.

The reactor was shut down on September 17, 2018.

In September 2019, Ocean Wind, a proposed 1,100 MWe offshore wind farm, with the approval of the New Jersey Board of Public Utilities, secured the capacity interconnection rights to bring the power generated by the wind farm on-shore at Oyster Creek. It can use the existing power infrastructure of the plant, after some upgrades, to connect to the regional transmission grid.

In January 2021, Holtec suggested that a "new generation" nuclear plant might be built at the location.

Design 
Oyster Creek was a single unit 636 MWe boiling water reactor power plant which first came online on December 23, 1969; it was one of the oldest operating nuclear power plants in the United States until it permanently ceased operation on September 17, 2018.

Cooling water for the plant was drawn from Barnegat Bay, a brackish estuary that empties into the Atlantic Ocean through the Barnegat Inlet. The average temperature increase was 10.4 °F (5.8 °C).

Oyster Creek was originally licensed for 40 years, but in April 2009 its license was extended for another 20 years by the United States Nuclear Regulatory Commission. "Based on the Atomic Energy Act, the Nuclear Regulatory Commission (NRC) issues licenses for commercial power reactors to operate for up to 40 years and allows these licenses to be renewed for up to another 20 years. This original 40-year term for reactor licenses was based on economic and antitrust considerations – not on limitations of nuclear technology. Due to this selected period, however, some structures and components may have been engineered on the basis of an expected 40-year service life."

License extension 
In July 2005, Exelon submitted an application to the United States Nuclear Regulatory Commission for a 20-year extension of the existing 40-year license for Oyster Creek, which was due to expire in 2009. According to a 2006 survey commissioned by the operators, relicensing of the power plant was supported by the majority of citizens living in areas surrounding the plant, and by local elected officials. However, some local opposition to re-licensing was evident at public hearings on the issue. On May 31, 2007, several Ocean County residents attended the Atomic Safety Licensing Board (ASLB) hearing in the county administration building. At that meeting, several of the local residents were opposed to re-licensing of the nuclear power plant.

The ASLB's decision on May 31, 2007 hearing led to a full public hearing on the issue of the monitoring of corrosion in the plant's drywell liner. The hearing was scheduled for September 24, 2007 in the county seat Toms River. In 2008, the Atomic Safety and Licensing Board twice rejected citizens' contentions concerning Oyster Creek. The majority of the three-judge panel ruled in favor of the plant, deciding "that the group's motion did not follow the proper guidelines for late-filed contentions and failed to link an alleged inadequacy to a significant safety issue."

In May 2007, the state Attorney General's Office, on behalf of the state Department of Environmental Protection (NJDEP), petitioned the federal Third Circuit Court of Appeals to compel the Nuclear Regulatory Commission to consider the potential for a terrorist attack as part of the criteria for Oyster Creek's licensing renewal process. In July 2007, the NJDEP faulted both Exelon and the Nuclear Regulatory Commission for relying on environmental studies that were up to 30 years old at the time of Exelon's relicensing application. The NJDEP refused to make a "positive consistency determination" for Oyster Creek, as required by the federal Coastal Zone Management Act. The positive determination is required for all applicants seeking to relicense an existing facility.

On April 8, 2009 the plant was granted a license extension to operate until April 9, 2029. This came a week after the Nuclear Regulatory Commission voted 3–1 against an appeal by anti-nuclear groups.

As of June 2009, five environmental and citizen groups were appealing the decision in the federal court. Richard Webster, attorney for the groups, claims the NRC did not have sufficient information to determine whether the plant can operate safely for the next 20 years.

“This has been the most extensive license renewal review to date, including the first adjudicatory hearing of a license renewal application,” said Eric Leeds, NRC's director of Nuclear Reactor Regulation. “The staff’s licensing and inspection scrutiny, along with the independent contributions of the ACRS, the ASLB and various citizen groups, should give the people of New Jersey added confidence that Oyster Creek will remain safe during its continued operation.”

Closure and decommissioning 
In December 2010, Exelon reported that Oyster Creek would close in 2019, 10 years earlier than planned so that cooling towers will not have to be installed to meet new environmental standards. In February 2018 the closure date was adjusted to October 2018. The reactor was ultimately shut down on September 17, 2018, and its fuel was removed by September 25, 2018.

Work will now begin on dismantlement and long-term decommissioning. Oyster Creek was sold to Holtec International in July 2019 after clearing regulatory approval, and a Holtec and SNC-Lavalin joint venture called Comprehensive Decommissioning International will be responsible for decommissioning the plant. About 200 of Oyster Creek's employees will remain at the plant to carry out decommissioning work with Holtec.

Electricity Production

Environment
As a part of Exelon Corporation, Oyster Creek followed the corporation's environmental policy.

In August 2009, workers found and stopped two small leaks of tritium, a radioactive isotope of hydrogen with a decay half-life of about 12 years. An NRC investigation of the leak found that the levels were too low to be a danger to public health. The leaks originated from two buried pipes that had not been properly insulated when they were last worked on in 1991. A second leak was discovered in August 2009, from a pipe leading into an electrical turbine building. Tritium levels found in this leak were measured at 10 microcuries per liter of water, higher than the 5 to 6 microcuries per liter found in the earlier leak. Tritium-contaminated groundwater remained on site and had not spread to any public water supplies.

In May 2010, the New Jersey DEP announced that water from the leak had spread to a nearby aquifer, though it stated there "was no imminent danger" to water supplies. At the current rate of migration, the water will reach the closest public wells within 10 to 15 years. The DEP stated there are several ways to address the problem, such as pumping out the tainted water, or injecting fresh water to force the tainted water backwards. A spokesman for Oyster Creek said they are working with the state on the issue, and have seen contamination levels steadily dropping, sometimes by "as much as 90%". Tritium causes less concern than other radioactive substances such as strontium, caesium and iodine. It does not bio-accumulate inside human tissue.

Safety
Employees at the Oyster Creek nuclear power plant averaged less radiation exposure from 2005 through 2008 than workers at any other nuclear power plant of similar design in the United States.

In early May 2011, fuel supplier General Electric notified the operators of the Oyster Creek and Nine Mile Point nuclear plants regarding safety calculation errors. General Electric had made mathematical errors which could have resulted in nuclear fuel getting hotter than operators expected, reducing the plants' margin of safety. Plant operators were able to make corrections.

Hurricane Sandy
On October 30, 2012, during Hurricane Sandy, the nuclear power plant's intake structure was flooded with six and a half feet of water as a result of the storm surge from the hurricane, with no damage sustained, and at the same time the plant was already down for maintenance and lost its electrical power from the grid, so operators called an alert that escalated the plant a step up from the lowest emergency level, and turned to backup generators to keep cooling the reactor.

In following months, local residents continued to voice their worries despite a statement by Gordon K. Hunegs of the Nuclear Regulatory Commission that during Hurricane Sandy "the plant was always safe."

Seismic risk
The Nuclear Regulatory Commission's estimate of the risk each year of an earthquake intense enough to cause core damage to the reactor at Oyster Creek was 1 in 71,429, according to an NRC study published in August 2010.

Surrounding population

The 2010 U.S. population within  of Oyster Creek was 133,609, an increase of 35.8 percent in a decade, according to an analysis of U.S. Census data for msnbc.com. The 2010 U.S. population within  was 4,482,261, an increase of 10.4 percent since 2000. Cities within  include Atlantic City ( to city center), Toms River ( to city center), Lakewood ( to city center), Asbury Park ( to city center), and Cherry Hill ( to city center).

Gallery

See also

 Anti-nuclear movement in the United States
 Nuclear power in the United States

References

External links
Oyster Creek Nuclear Generating Station at Exelon
Oyster Creek Nuclear Generating Station at Department of Energy
Groups seek to stop relicensing of nuclear plants
Radioactive contamination and potential health risks from the Oyster Creek nuclear power reactor
Powering New Jersey’s Future: A Clean Energy Strategy for replacing the Oyster Creek and Salem Nuclear Plants

Buildings and structures in Ocean County, New Jersey
Energy infrastructure completed in 1969
Exelon
Lacey Township, New Jersey
Nuclear power plants in New Jersey
U.S. Route 9
Former nuclear power stations in the United States